Asterolecaniidae is a family of scale insects commonly known as pit scales or asterolecaniids. They typically cause a depression in the host plant's tissues and often cause distortion of the shoots. They are found on a range of hosts but are especially common on oaks, bamboos and a number of ornamental plants. Members of this family occur in most regions of the world but are most abundant in the northern hemisphere. There are about 25 genera and 243 recorded species.

Life cycle
Pit scales in this family have three female instars and five male instars. They are generally found on the leaves or shoots of the host plant and often cause deformation. The body is usually covered by a clear or transparent test. Eggs are laid under this and occupy the cavity formed as the adult female dies and shrinks in the autumn. Males are not usually found but when they do occur, they develop under a test in a similar fashion to the females.

Genera

 Abditicoccus
 Acanthococcus
 Amorphococcus
 Asterodiaspis
 Asterolecanium
 Bambusaspis
 Elegatis
 Endernia
 Frenchia
 Grammococcus
 Hsuia
 Hyalococcus
 Liuaspis
 Mycetococcus
 Mycococcus
 Neoasterodiaspis
 Oacoccus
 Palmaspis
 Pauroaspis
 Planchonia
 Polea
 Pollinia
 Russellaspis
 Sclerosococcus
 Trachycoccus

References

  

 
Scale insects
Hemiptera families
Neococcoids